Erik Wayne Rasmussen (born March 28, 1977) is an American former professional ice hockey player who formerly played center  and left wing for the National Hockey League's New Jersey Devils.

Early life 
Rasmussen was born in Minneapolis. He won the Mr. Hockey award in 1995 as the best high school player in Minnesota. He played for the University of Minnesota for two years before going pro.

Career 
Rasmussen was drafted in the first round, seventh overall by the Buffalo Sabres in the 1996 NHL Entry Draft. He then played for the Buffalo Sabres and Los Angeles Kings. He played 2007–08 on New Jersey's AHL affiliate in Lowell and made a contract for season 2008–09 to Porin Ässät.

Career statistics

Regular season and playoffs

International

Awards and honors

References

External links

1977 births
American men's ice hockey left wingers
Buffalo Sabres draft picks
Buffalo Sabres players
Living people
Los Angeles Kings players
Lowell Devils players
Minnesota Golden Gophers men's ice hockey players
National Hockey League first-round draft picks
New Jersey Devils players
People from St. Louis Park, Minnesota
Rochester Americans players
Ice hockey players from Minnesota